Gerard Jones (born July 10, 1957) is an American writer, known primarily for his non-fiction work about American entertainment media, and his comic book scripting, which includes co-creating the superhero Prime for Malibu Comics, and writing for the Green Lantern and Justice League lines for DC Comics.

In 2018, Jones was convicted of possession of child pornography, and sentenced to six years in prison.

Early life
Jones was born in Cut Bank, Montana, and raised in the California towns of Los Gatos and Gilroy.

Career
From 1983 to 1988, Jones and his writing partner Will Jacobs were contributors to National Lampoon magazine. From 1984 to 1986, Jones and Jacobs wrote articles about the Silver Age of Comics for the hobbyist publication Comics Feature. They also wrote The Beaver Papers – a book parodying the TV series Leave It to Beaver – and The Comic Book Heroes: From the Silver Age to the Present. He and Jacobs returned to humorous fiction in 2014 with The Beaver Papers 2 and My Pal Splendid Man.

From 1987 to 2001, Jones wrote comic books for Marvel Comics, DC Comics, Dark Horse Comics, Viz Media, Malibu Comics, and other publishers, including such series as Green Lantern, Justice League, Prime, Ultraforce, El Diablo, Wonder Man, Martian Manhunter, Elongated Man, The Shadow, Pokémon Adventures, Dragon Ball, Batman, and – with Jacobs – The Trouble with Girls.

Since 1993, Jones has written primarily non-fiction books, mainly concerning American culture and media, including television comedy (Honey I'm Home), violence in entertainment (Killing Monsters), and comic-book history (Men of Tomorrow). He appears in documentaries, including Look, Up in the Sky: The Amazing Story of Superman, American Masters: Lucille Ball, and Make 'Em Laugh: The Funny Business of America.

Personal life
The residence of Jones and his wife is in San Francisco.

Possession of images of child sexual abuse
Jones was arrested in December 2016 on charges of distributing and possessing images of child sexual abuse. His lawyer first entered a plea of "not guilty", but in April 2018 Jones changed his plea to "guilty", admitting that the police had found "numerous electronic devices containing tens of thousands of images and hundreds of videos of child pornography" in his home. In August 2018, Jones was sentenced to six years in prison, followed by a five-year period of supervised release, with an unspecified amount of restitution to be paid to his victims.

Jones subsequently began writing about his experiences in prison, and about the life events that led him to commit his crimes; these writings were collected by his friends and former colleagues, and posted online.

Awards
2005 Eisner Award, Best Comics-Related Book: Men of Tomorrow: Geeks, Gangsters, and the Birth of the Comic Book

Bibliography

Books
 The Beaver Papers: The Story of the Lost Season (with Will Jacobs, Crown Publishers, 1984)
 Honey I'm Home: Sitcoms Selling the American Dream (St. Martin's Griffin, 1993)
 The Comic Book Heroes: The First History of Modern Comic Books – From the Silver Age to the Present (with Will Jacobs, Crown Publishing Group 1985, 1996 – revised edition –  )
 Killing Monsters: Why Children Need Fantasy, Superheroes and Make-Believe Violence (Basic Books, 2003)
 Men of Tomorrow: Geeks, Gangsters, and the Birth of the Comic Book (Basic Books, 2005)

Comics

 2099 Unlimited #1–10
 Batman: Fortunate Son, DC Comics, 1999
 Batman: Jazz #1–3
 Dragon Ball (English translation), Viz Media 1998–2004
 Dragon Ball Z (English translation), Viz Media, 1998–2006
 Dragon Ball: Full Color (English translation), Viz Media, 2014–current
 El Diablo, DC Comics, 1989–1991
 Elongated Man #1–4
 Freex #1–18
 Godwheel #0–3
 Green Lantern (Volume 3) #1–47, DC Comics, 1990–1993 
 Green Lantern: Emerald Dawn #2–6 (With Jim Owsley, Keith Giffen, M.D. Bright and Romeo Tanghal), DC Comics, 1989–1990
 Green Lantern: Emerald Dawn II #1–6, DC Comics, 1991
 Green Lantern: Mosaic #1–18, DC Comics, 1992–1993  
 Guy Gardner: Reborn #1–3
 Guy Gardner #1–10
 Hulk 2099 #1–10
 Justice League Europe #14–57, Annual #2–5
 Justice League America #0, 93–113, Annual #9
 Justice League Spectacular #1
 Martian Manhunter: American Secrets, DC Comics
 Oktane (with Gene Ha, Dark Horse Comics, 1996)
 Pokémon Adventures Volumes 1–14 (English translation), Viz Media, 2000–2003, 2009–2011
 Power of Prime #1–4, Malibu Comics, 1995
 Prime #1–26, Malibu Comics, 1993–1995
 Prime #1–15, Malibu Comics, 1995–1996
 Prime/Captain America #1
 Prime vs. Incredible Hulk #1
 Ranma ½ (English translation), Viz Media, 1993–2006
 The Score #1–4 (with Mark Badger, Piranha Press, 1989–1990)
 Solitaire #1–12
 The Trouble with Girls (with Will Jacobs and Tim Hamilton, Malibu Comics, 1987)
 Ultraforce #0–6
 Wonder Man #1–29, Marvel Comics, 1991–1994

References

External links
 The Porn Prison, Jones's prison blog
 
 
 

1957 births
American bloggers
American comics writers
Comics critics
Living people
People from Cut Bank, Montana
Writers from San Francisco
20th-century American writers
21st-century American writers
American people convicted of child pornography offenses